Omaha High School is a comprehensive public high school located in Omaha, Arkansas, United States. The school provides secondary education in grades 7 through 12 for students in the Omaha and surrounding unincorporated communities of Boone County, Arkansas. It is one of six public high schools in Boone County and the sole high school administered by the Omaha School District.

Academics 
Omaha High School is a Title I school that is accredited by the ADE.

Curriculum 
The assumed course of study follows the Smart Core curriculum developed by the Arkansas Department of Education (ADE), which requires students complete at least 22 units prior to graduation. Students complete regular coursework and exams and may take Advanced Placement (AP) courses and exam with the opportunity to receive college credit.

Athletics 
The Omaha High School mascot is the Eagle with green and gold serving as the school colors.

The Omaha Eagles compete in interscholastic activities within the 1A Classification, the state's smallest classification administered by the Arkansas Activities Association. The Eagles play within the 1A East Conference. Omaha fields junior varsity and varsity teams in basketball (boys/girls), baseball, fastpitch softball, track and field (boys/girls).

References 

Public high schools in Arkansas
Public middle schools in Arkansas
Schools in Boone County, Arkansas